Lintneria is a genus of moths in the family Sphingidae, containing the following species:

Lintneria arthuri (Rothschild, 1897)
Lintneria aurigutta (Rothschild & Jordan, 1903)
Lintneria balsae (Schaus, 1932)
Lintneria biolleyi (Schaus, 1912)
Lintneria ermitoides (Strecker 1874)
Lintneria eremitus (Hübner, 1823)
Lintneria geminus (Rothschild & Jordan, 1903)
Lintneria istar (Rothschild & Jordan  1903)
Lintneria justiciae (Walker 1856)
Lintneria lugens (Walker 1856)
Lintneria maura (Burmeister 1879)
Lintneria merops (Boisduval 1870)
Lintneria phalerata (Kernbach 1955)
Lintneria pitzahuac (Mooser 1948)
Lintneria porioni (Cadiou 1995)
Lintneria praelongus (Rothschild & Jordan  1903)
Lintneria pseudostigmatica (Gehlen 1928)
Lintneria separatus (Neumoegen 1885)
Lintneria smithi (Cadiou 1998)
Lintneria tricolor (Clark 1923)
Lintneria xantus (Cary 1963)

 
Sphingini
Moth genera
Taxa named by Arthur Gardiner Butler